Sierra Sur de Jaén is a Spanish geographical indication for Vino de la Tierra wines in the Sierra Sur de Jaén area, Andalusia, Spain. Vino de la Tierra is one step below the mainstream Denominación de Origen indication on the Spanish wine quality ladder.

The area covered by this geographical indication comprises the municipalities of Alcalá la Real, Castillo de Locubín, Frailes, Fuensanta de Martos, Valdepeñas De Jaén Los Villares, Alcaudete and Martos, in the southwestern part of the province of Jaén.

This geographic location acquired its Vino de la Tierra status in 2003.

Grape varieties
 Red: tintas: Garnacha tinta, Pinot noir, Syrah, Cabernet Sauvignon, Tempranillo and Merlot
 White: Jaén blanco and Chardonnay

References

Comarcas of Andalusia
Spanish wine
Wine regions of Spain
Wine-related lists
Appellations

es:Vino de la Tierra de la Sierra Sur de Jaén